Coptisine is an alkaloid found in Chinese goldthread (Coptis chinensis), greater celandine, and opium.  Famous for the bitter taste that it produces, it is used in Chinese herbal medicine along with the related compound berberine for digestive disorders caused by bacterial infections.

References

Isoquinoline alkaloids
Benzodioxoles
Quaternary ammonium compounds